Natzmer is a surname. Notable people with the surname include:

 Dubislav Gneomar von Natzmer (1654–1739), Prussian field marshal
 Oldwig von Natzmer (1904–1980), German general
 Renate von Natzmer (1898–1935), German spy